The Iranian ambassador in Bangkok is the official representative of the Government in Tehran to the Government of Thailand.

List of representatives

See also
Iran–Thailand relations

References 

 
Thailand
Iran